William Samuel Robinson (1880–1926) was an English footballer who played in the Football League for Bolton Wanderers, Hull City and Manchester City.

References

1880 births
1926 deaths
English footballers
Association football midfielders
English Football League players
Bolton Wanderers F.C. players
Manchester City F.C. players
Hull City A.F.C. players
Accrington Stanley F.C. (1891) players